Langhagen station is a railway station in the municipality of Langhagen, located in the Rostock district in Mecklenburg-Vorpommern, Germany.

References

Railway stations in Mecklenburg-Western Pomerania
Buildings and structures in Rostock (district)
Railway stations in Germany opened in 1961